Horace Waters was a 19th-century hymn publisher and frequent collaborator with Stephen Foster and Susan McFarland Parkhurst. In 1845, he established his "Piano and Music Establishment". He was a retailer of organs, pianos, sheet music and melodeons. In the 1850s he began to manufacture his own organs and melodeons. He added his own line of pianos to his manufacturing after the Civil War. His sons, T. Leed Waters and Horace Waters Jr became active in the company around 1864. The popularity of the melodeons and organs declined while the piano became a more common instrument in the home and so the company discontinued the manufacture of these. He also produced player pianos.

Waters was described as having strong convictions, and his life was regarded as "a living commentary upon the precepts and principles of the New Testament".

Works

References

1812 births
American Christian hymnwriters
Music publishing companies of the United States
Music publishers (people)
1893 deaths